Downtown Disney (officially the Downtown Disney District) is an outdoor shopping center located at the Disneyland Resort in Anaheim, California. It opened on January 12, 2001; a component of the Disneyland Resort expansion project alongside the Disney California Adventure theme park and Disney's Grand Californian Hotel & Spa.

Location and history
Downtown Disney connects the two Disneyland Resort theme parks with its three resort hotels, running from the western side of the property's Esplanade to the Disneyland Hotel. West Street, which bordered Disneyland's western side, was rechristened Disneyland Drive and lowered to accommodate a pedestrian bridge that connects much of Downtown Disney to the Disneyland Hotel and Disney's Paradise Pier Hotel. A Disneyland Monorail System station sits adjacent to the pedestrian bridge.

The area has featured several shops and restaurants, ranging from popular retail brands to many Disney-operated shops including a World of Disney store running beneath much of the Grand California Hotel.

Downtown Disney has featured as many as 30 shops, but there have been changes due to announcements in late 2017. In July 2019, parking for Downtown Disney was relocated to south of the Disney's Paradise Pier Hotel (Simba parking lot). In addition, a pedestrian bridge linking the Pixar Pals and Mickey and Friends parking structures to the shopping district was opened on September 13, 2019.

Canceled Fourth Hotel and subsequent activities 
In 2017, plans were announced for a fourth resort hotel at the property. Situated in front of the Disneyland Hotel, the new hotel would displace much of the westernmost portion of Downtown Disney and would have featured 700 rooms. The cost of construction for the hotel would have been offset by up to $267 million in tax rebates over 20 years, allowing the resort to keep a percentage of the transient occupancy tax levied on Anaheim hotels.

In Summer of 2018, several large Downtown Disney tenants closed in preparation for the new hotel's construction - an AMC Theatres cinema, Rainforest Cafe and ESPN Zone restaurants, and smaller tenants including Earl of Sandwich and a Starbucks location.

Weeks after the closures took place, growing tensions between Disney and the City of Anaheim over the subsidy and the hotel's location led to the project being put on hold. Days after the announcement that the project was postponed, Disneyland requested that the tax subsidies be rescinded. The Anaheim City Council voted to rescind the tax subsidies days later.

After weeks of inactivity at the hotel's proposed site, Disney announced in October 2018 that the fourth hotel project had been canceled. In October 2018, Earl of Sandwich and Starbucks reopened. After several years of vacancy, Disney announced that the former Rainforest Café location would become home to the Star Wars Trading Post, a retail location selling Star Wars: Galaxy's Edge merchandise, which opened on February 19, 2021. As of February 2021, the former AMC Theatre and ESPN Zone remain vacant.

On March 14, 2020, the Disneyland Resort, including Downtown Disney, temporarily closed due to the COVID-19 pandemic. Downtown Disney remained closed until July 9, 2020. The district reopened with enhanced safety measures, including mandatory face masks, reduced capacity and temperature screening upon arrival. These measures were lifted on June 15, 2021, following California's reopening.
From November 19, 2020, to March 14, 2021, the resort expanded the district temporarily into Buena Vista Street at Disney California Adventure.

In November 2021, Disney announced a reimagining of the West Side of Downtown Disney with new shopping, dining, and entertainment experiences. Construction began with the demolishing of AMC Theatres, Starbucks, and Earl of Sandwich beginning in January 2022. On April 27, 2022, Din Tai Fung was announced to be the anchor for the expansion. The announcement also came with a reimagining of UVA Bar and Catal into separate restaurants named Centrico and Paseo, as well as a mid-century modern design for the district's new west end.

References

External links

Disneyland Resort
Shopping malls in Orange County, California
Shopping malls established in 2001
2001 establishments in California